The Ardmore Historic District is a  national historic district located at Winston-Salem, Forsyth County, North Carolina.  The district encompasses 2,093 contributing buildings and two contributing sites. The district consists of at least ten platted residential developments from 1910 through 1924 as well as three large apartment complexes from 1947 through 1951, one of which was controversially demolished in 2021.  It includes works designed by Hall Crews and by Northup & O'Brien.  It includes Queen Anne and Bungalow/craftsman architecture.

It was listed on the National Register of Historic Places in 2004.

References

Historic districts on the National Register of Historic Places in North Carolina
Queen Anne architecture in North Carolina
Buildings and structures completed in 1914
Geography of Winston-Salem, North Carolina
National Register of Historic Places in Winston-Salem, North Carolina